Music Hath Harms is an American film released in 1929. A two-reel short it was produced by Al Christie. The film stars Spencer Williams and Roberta Hyson with musical performances by Curtis Mosby and the Blues Blowers. It was part of the Florian Slappey series. The story features a con man promising to wow an audience with a musical performance. The film remains in existence and is available online.

The film series, based on Octavus Roy Cohen's Darktown Birmingham stories published in the Saturday Evening Post include racial caricatures and exaggerated dialect. The film is one of three that survive from the series produced by Al Christie and is among the early "talkie" (with sound) films featuring African American casts. The other surviving films from the series are Framing of the Shrew and Oft in the Silly Night. Williams also served as the assistant director on the film although he received no credits.

Cast
Spencer Williams as Roscoe Griggers
Roberta Hyson as Zenia Sprowl
Harry Tracy as Florian Slappey
Nathan Curry as Prof. Aleck Champagne
Leon Hereford as Sam Ginn
Harry Porter as Willie Trout
Curtis Mosby as Orchestra Leader
Mosby's Blues Blowers as the Band

See also
Music Hath Charms, a British musical comedy film released in 1935

References

1929 films